Przeciwnica  is a village in the administrative district of Gmina Oborniki, within Oborniki County, Greater Poland Voivodeship, in west-central Poland.

The village has a population of 41.

References

Przeciwnica